An Angle was an American indie rock band from Sacramento, California. At the center of this group was singer-songwriter Kris Anaya. The band signed to Drive-Thru Records in September 2004. In March 2007, the band went on a tour of the US, leading up to June 12, 2007, release of The Truth Is That You Are Alive. On November 15, 2007, a music video was released for "Clean and Gold". In April 2008, the band appeared at the Bamboozle Left festival. On Monday, July 20, 2008, Matt Sergent announced via the group's Myspace page that the members of An Angle had decided to go their separate ways. In April 2013, it was announced that An Angle would be playing a reunion show for Sacramento's Launch Festival Kick Off Party 2013.

Members 
Kris Anaya – vocals, guitar
Matt Sergent – vocals, bass
Trevor Church – vocals, guitar
Aram Deradoorian – vocals, drums
Dan Block – vocals, keyboards, trombone

Discography

Albums 
And Take It with a Grain of Salt (2002/2004)
We Can Breathe under Alcohol (2005)
The Truth Is That You Are Alive (2007)

EPs 
5 Days 5 Songs (2006)

Non-album tracks 
 "A Song for Meghan" – released on Songs to Shoot up to, a split record with Mike Sparks (2004)
 "War Is Over" – released on Happy Holidays from Drive-Thru Records (2004)

References

External links 
 
 Interview with Kris for More Important Than Music

Musical groups established in 2000
Musical groups disestablished in 2008
Rock music groups from California
Musical groups from Sacramento, California
Drive-Thru Records artists